This is a list of hospitals in Lebanon.

Hospitals

 Al-Rayan Hospital - Baalbek
American University of Beirut Medical Center - Beirut
 Al Iman Hospital - Aley
Al-Mazloum Hospital - Tripoli
Al-Salam Hospital - Tripoli
 Al Watani Hospital - Aley
Al Haykal Hospital - Dahr el Ain, North Lebanon
 Al Hikmeh Hospital - Nabatiye
 Al Najde Hospital - Nabatiye
 Al Janoub Hospital - Nabatiye
 Baabda Governmental Hospital - Baabda
Baakleen Medical Center-Baakleen
 Bahman Hospital - Dahieh
 Bellevue Medical Center - Mansourieh
 Beirut General Hospital - Beirut
 Beit Chabab Hospital - Beit Chabab, North Metn
Beirut International Hospital Beirut
 Bikhazi Medical Group - Beirut
 Centre Hospitalier de Bhannes - Bhanness
 Centre Hospitalier du Nord - Zgharta
 Centre Hospitalier Universitaire Notre Dame des Secours - Byblos
 Chtaura Hospital - Chtaura, Bekaa
Chehayeb International Hospital - Aley
Clinique du Levant - Horch Tabet - Sin el Fil
 Clemenceau Medical Center - Beirut
Dar El Amal University Hospital - Douris, Baalbeck
Dr. Ahmad El Masri Hospital - Bednayel, Beqaa
Ein w Zein Hospital - Ein w Zein, Shouf
El Koura Hospital - El Koura
Ghandour Hospital - Nabatiye
Hôtel-Dieu de France - Beirut
Hopital Des Soeurs Du Rosaire (Haddad) - Gemmayze, Beirut
 Hospital Akkar Rahal - Halba, Lebanon
 Hiram Hospital - Tyre - Jal El Bahr
Hopital Dr. Georges Moarbes - Furn el Chebbak
 Hammoud Hospital University Medical Center - Saida
 Hotel-Dieu De France - Achrafieh, Beirut
 Hôpital Abou Jaoudeh - Jal el Dib
 Hôpital Hayek - Horsh Tabet, Sin El Fil
 Hôpital Libanais Geitaoui - Beirut
 Hôpital Libano Français - Zahlé
 Hôpital Serhal – Rabieh
 Hôpital Youssef Rahban – Zgharta
 Hospital AlKoura - Koura District
 Hospital Albert Haykel Hopital Albert Haykel- Koura District
Islami Private Hospital - Tripoli
 Jabal Amel Hospital - Tyre
Kamil's National Hospital - Aley
 Keserwan Medical Center
 Khoury General Hospital–Zahle, Lebanon
LAU Medical Center-Rizk Hospital - Achrafieh, Beirut.
 Lebanese Italian Hospital - Tyre, Lebanon
Lebanon Heart Hospital - Tripoli
 Makassed General Hospital - Beirut
 Melki Hospital - Tripoli
 Middle East Laser Clinic - Hazmieh
 Monla Hospital - Tripoli
 Mount-Lebanon Hospital, Gharios Medical Center - Chiyah
 New Mazaloum hospital - Tripoli
 Nini Hospital - Tripoli
 Notre Dame Maritime hospital - Byblos
 Notre Dame Hospital - Jounieh
Nabatiye Governmental Hospital - Nabatiye
Orient Hospital - Beirut
 Rafik Hariri University Hospital - Jnah
 Sacred Heart Hospital - Hazmieh
 Sahel Hospital - Beirut
 Saint Charles Hospital - Fayadieh
 Saint George Hospital - Beirut
 Saint Georges Hospital - Ajaltoun
 Saint Joseph Hospital - Dora, Lebanon
 Saint Maaraqe Hospital - Maaraqe
 St Therese Hospital - Hadath
 Saydet Zgharta Hospital - Zgharta
 Tannourine Governmental Hospital - Tannourine, Batroun
Tatari Hospital - Baalbak
 Trad Hospital - Beirut
Tal Chiha Hospital - Zahle, Beqaa
University Medical Center-Rizk Hospital - Beirut
 Zahraa University Hospital - Beirut

References

Images

Lebanon
Lists of buildings and structures in Lebanon
 List
Lebanon